The 1991–92 Sri Lankan cricket season featured a Test series with Sri Lanka playing against Australia.

Honours
 P Saravanamuttu Trophy – Colts Cricket Club
 Hatna Trophy – Nomads Sports Club
 Most runs – MC Mendis 551 @ 78.71 (HS 177*)
 Most wickets – GP Wickramasinghe 38 @ 13.10 (BB 10–41)

Test series
Australia won the three-match Test series 1–0 with 2 draws:
 1st Test @ Sinhalese Sports Club Ground, Colombo – Australia won by 16 runs
 2nd Test @ R Premadasa Stadium, Colombo – match drawn
 3rd Test @ Tyronne Fernando Stadium, Moratuwa – match drawn

External sources
  CricInfo – brief history of Sri Lankan cricket
 CricketArchive – Tournaments in Sri Lanka

Further reading
 Wisden Cricketers' Almanack 1993

Sri Lankan cricket seasons from 1972–73 to 1999–2000